Patrick Clifford Matzdorf (born December 26, 1949) is an American former high jumper, who set a world record of 2.29 meters (7'-6 1/4") at a World All-Star Track Meet in Berkeley, California.  Matzdorf, a Junior at the University of Wisconsin, entered the July 3, 1971 meet against the Soviet Union with a personal best of 7'-3" (2.21 m.) achieved earlier that year in March. He broke the world record that day on his third attempt at 2.29 meters.

Matzdorf utilized the bent-leg straddle jumping style, a modification of the classic straight-leg straddle which dominated the sport in the 1950s and 1960s.

Education Sport 

At the University of Wisconsin, he played basketball as well.

Corporate Life 

Patrick Clifford Matzdorf worked for AT&T Bell Labs at Indian Hill in Autoplex. He coined the phrase "wireless" as part of a standards meeting and was distinguished by his mustache.

Corporate Sports 
 
During his life at AT&T, according to co-workers, he played softball, which every time at the plate he stroked a home run. A company teammate, Tom Giammarresi, remembers "his throws from left field that were, not far off the ground, and traveled all the way to home plate like bullets." He also played coed volleyball. According to Sheila K. Brown Klinger, she stated "we all played volleyball together at IH (Randy Downing, director, and Dave Carbaugh, DH, were also on our team)." He was considered a great athlete. 
.

References 

1949 births
Living people
American male high jumpers
Sportspeople from Sheboygan, Wisconsin
World record setters in athletics (track and field)
Athletes (track and field) at the 1971 Pan American Games
Pan American Games gold medalists for the United States
Pan American Games medalists in athletics (track and field)
Medalists at the 1971 Pan American Games